"Junk Food Junkie" is a 1976 novelty song by Larry Groce.  It spent 15 weeks on the U.S. charts, reaching #9 on the Billboard Hot 100. It was Groce's only song to chart.
"Junk Food Junkie" spent two weeks at #31 in Canada, and it was also a minor hit on the Adult Contemporary chart.
The song is currently released on K-tel International.

Background
The song tells the story of a man leading a double life: during the day he boasts of his natural diet lifestyle, however, at night, he indulges his secret addiction to junk food.

Chart history

Weekly charts

Year-end charts

Popular culture
The song was performed by Mackenzie Phillips and The Jacksons, on the June 23, 1976, episode of The Jacksons TV variety show.

See also
 List of 1970s one-hit wonders in the United States

References

External links
Larry Groce "Junk Food Junkie" lyrics
 

1976 songs
1976 singles
Warner Records singles
Novelty songs